"You're My Everything"' is a 1931 song with music by Harry Warren and lyrics by Mort Dixon and Joe Young. The song was written for the revue The Laugh Parade starring Ed Wynn which opened in New York City on November 2, 1931. The song was sung by Jeanne Aubert and Lawrence Gray.

Hit versions in 1931 and 1932 were by Arden-Ohman Orchestra (vocal by Frank Luther); Russ Columbo; and Ben Selvin.

Other versions
Al Bowlly
Billy Eckstine and his Orchestra
Max Bygraves, chart single 1969
Connie Francis 	
Carmen Cavallaro 
Francis Scott and His Orchestra 
Gisele MacKenzie	
Gayle Larson
Jerry Colonna 
Joni James 
Miles Davis Quintet - with false starts
Jerry Carretta

The song also appears on the following albums:
Hub-Tones  by trumpeter Freddie Hubbard recorded on October 10, 1962
Hopeless Romantics  by American vocalist Michael Feinstein accompanied by pianist George Shearing, recorded in 2002 
Trilogy (Chick Corea album)
soundtrack of Painting the Clouds with Sunshine (film)  1951, directed by David Butler and starring Dennis Morgan and Virginia Mayo
Structurally Sound by American jazz saxophonist Booker Ervin recorded in 1967 
I Don't Want to Be Hurt Anymore a 1964 studio album by Nat King Cole
Love Songs (Nat King Cole album)
The Legendary Prestige Quintet Sessions by the Miles Davis Quintet
Sarah Vaughan Sings Broadway: Great Songs from Hit Shows
Jazz Is a Kick by jazz trombonist and arranger Bob Brookmeyer recorded in 1960
The Awakening (Ahmad Jamal album)
Stompin' by organist Shirley Scott recorded in 1961
Play It Now  by saxophonist Al Cohn which was recorded in 1975
Jazz Time  by Red Nichols and his Five Pennies in 1950
A Harry Warren Showcase by pianist Kenny Drew recorded in 1957
Let There Be Love (1993 Joni James album)
Summer Times by pianist Franck Amsallem
No Amps Allowed - Howard Alden/Jack Lesberg CD Chiaroscuro Records 1988

References

1931 songs
1967 singles
1969 singles
Songs with music by Harry Warren
Songs with lyrics by Mort Dixon
Songs with lyrics by Joe Young (lyricist)